Omorgus australasiae is a species of hide beetle in the subfamily Omorginae.

References

australasiae
Beetles described in 1842